Ailincăi is a Romanian surname. Notable people with the surname include:
 Adriana Ailincăi (born 1999), Romanian rower
 Crina Pintea-Ailincăi (born 1990), Romanian professional handballer
 Dumitru Ailincăi (1908–1995), pen name of a Romanian journalist, novelist, historian, writer and professor

Romanian-language surnames
Matronymic surnames